Operation Radd-ul-Fasaad is a codename of a combined military operation by the Pakistani military in support of local law enforcement agencies to disarm and eliminate the terrorist sleeper cells across all states of Pakistan, started on 22 February 2017. The operation is aimed to eliminate the threat of terrorism, and consolidating the gains of Operation Zarb-e-Azb which was launched in 2014 as a joint military offensive. It is further aimed at ensuring the security of Pakistan's borders. The operation is ongoing active participation from Pakistan Army, Pakistan Air Force, Pakistan Navy, Pakistan Police and other Warfare and Civil Armed Forces managed under the Government of Pakistan. More than 375,000 operations have been carried out against terrorists so far. This Operation has been mostly acknowledged after Operation Zarb e Azb.

Pakistan had faced the worst brunt of terrorism due to its proximity to the all-time unstable Afghanistan and radicalization injected into the region since the Afghan-Russo war of 1979. Offering our land to host global Jihadism in the 80s changed the social fabric, resulting in a massive onslaught of terrorism that Pakistan had gone through since then. 
The pinnacle of infusion of venom by the multi-headed serpent of radicalization and terrorism was the era of 2006-2014. Pakistan Army fought terrorism gallantry and became the only army in the world that defeated terrorism without external help through several military operations, the biggest such operation was “Operation Zarb-e-Azb” which was started in June 2014. This operation successfully eliminated terrorist hideouts, nurseries, and breeding grounds in urban as well as far-flung areas. However, Pakistan could not be left without placing a mechanism that could ensure continuity and sustainability in anti-terrorism efforts to consolidate the gains we had achieved through Operation Zarb-e-Azb. At that time the change of command in the Pakistan Army was crucial and after the retirement of the then COAS Gen Raheel Sharif, everybody who had been covering operations against terrorism understood that the long-lasting success of Operation Zarb-e-Azb was depending upon an Army leadership that could manage the rehabilitation of internally displaced people in our erstwhile Federally Administrative Tribal Areas (FATA areas), Swat Valley and all other Afghan bordering areas.

The operation entailed the conduct of Broad Spectrum Security (Counter Terrorism) operations by Rangers in Punjab, continuation of ongoing operations across the country and focus on more effective border security management. Countrywide disarmament and explosive control were also given as additional objectives of the operation. The National Action Plan was pursued as the hallmark of this operation.

Etymologies 
Radd-ul-Fasaad literally means "elimination of strife". Radd means "rejection". Fasaad is synonymous to the Arabic word Fitna which means "civil strife".

Background 
In the month of February 2017, the terrorist group Jamaat-ul-Ahrar launched Operation Ghazi with several suicide attacks across Pakistan. According to media, Jammat-ul-Ahrar claimed the responsibility of these terror attacks, this operation reduced after the death of Abdul Rashid Ghazi, who was shot dead by Pakistan army in Lal Masjid during Operation Sunrise. After this, many other terrorist groups started terrorist attacks often across all over Pakistan, quickly Pakistan announced the launch of Operation Radd-ul-Fasaad.
On the 4th Anniversary of the Operation, a Database was launched on February 22, 2021, covering all news of terrorism, operations, killings during this Operation.

Operation Sunrise

Army Operation

Terrorists retaliation 

In July 2007, a series of suicide bombings took place across Pakistan in the aftermath of the Lal Masjid siege which resulted in an end to the 10-month truce held by the Waziristan Accord. At least 154 people were killed and more than 230 others were injured in the suicide attacks.

Pakistan Retaliation 
In reaction to these attacks Pakistan started the war against all the militant groups across Pakistan which turned into Insurgency in Balochistan, Insurgency in Khyber Pakhtunkhwa and Sectarian Violence.

Operation Ghazi 

Operation Ghazi was the codename of the terrorist operation launched by Jamaat-ul-Ahrar with several other terrorist groups to get revenge on death of Abdul Rashid Ghazi by launching mass terrorist attacks across Pakistan. Although, Pakistan managed to defeat Jamaat-ul-Ahrar in Operation Ghazi but many other terrorist groups were already spread across all states and launched many mass terror attacks.

On 13 February 2017, Jamaat-ul-Ahrar released a video announcing the launch of "Operation Ghazi", named after Abdul Rashid Ghazi who was killed in July 2007 inside the Lal Masjid. The operation started with the suicide bombing at the Mall, in which 12 civilians and six police officers were killed and several civilians were killed in this operation.

2017 Major terror attacks

January 2017 Parachinar bombing 

On 21 January 2017, a bomb was detonated at a vegetable market in Parachinar, in the Kurram Valley of the Federally Administered Tribal Areas of Pakistan. At least 25 people were killed and 87 injured by the explosion. Parachinar is the administrative headquarters of the Kurram Agency near the Afghan border. The same area has previously seen several blasts in 2008, February 2012, September 2012, 2013 and in December 2015.

February 2017 Lahore suicide bombing 

On 13 February 2017, a suicide bombing took place on the Mall Road in Lahore, Pakistan, where a large crowd of Pharmaceutical manufacturers and owners, herbal manufactureres, homeopathic manufactureres, wholesellers, pharmaceutical marketeers, chemists, stockists, distributors, doctors and pharmacists were holding a protest at Charing Cross in front of the Punjab provincial assembly. According to Punjab Police sources, 18 people were killed including several police officials, and at least 87 were injured.

Jamaat-ul-Ahrar, a faction of the banned Tehrik-i-Taliban (TTP), claimed responsibility for the attack. Local authorities cordoned off the site to begin investigations. According to Pakistani authorities, the attack was orchestrated from Afghanistan, where the militant group operates sanctuaries. On 23 February, Pakistani security forces killed the mastermind of the attack, Wajihullah, near the Afghan border following the launch of Operation Radd-ul-Fasaad.

2017 Sehwan suicide bombing 

On 16 February 2017, a suicide bombing took place inside the Shrine of Lal Shahbaz Qalandar in Sehwan, Sindh, Pakistan, where pilgrims were performing a Sufi ritual after the evening prayers. At least 90 people were killed and over 300 injured.

2017 Charsadda suicide bombing 

On 21 February 2017, suicide bombers targeted a sessions court in Tangi, Charsadda District, Khyber Pakhtunkhwa, Pakistan. At least 7 people were killed, including a lawyer and more than 20 others injured. Tehrik-i-Taliban Pakistan faction Jamaat-ul-Ahrar claimed responsibility for the attack.

March 2017 Parachinar suicide bombing 

On 31 March 2017, a car bombing took place at a market in Parachinar, northwest Pakistan. The bombing was believed to be motivated by sectarianism, as the majority of the area's residents are Shia Muslims. At least 24 people were killed and more than 70 injured as a result of the blast. Prime Minister Nawaz Sharif and other political leaders condemned the attack.

2017 Mastung suicide bombing 

On 12 May 2017, a suicide bombing targeted the convoy of the Deputy Chairman of the Senate of Pakistan, Abdul Ghafoor Haideri, a JUI (F) member, on the N-25 National Highway in Mastung District, Balochistan, Pakistan. At least 28 people were killed; 40 others were injured, including the Senator. The Islamic State of Iraq and the Levant claimed responsibility for the attack. The attack was an unsuccessful attempt to assassinate Haideri.

Gwadar Labors shooting 

On 13 May 2017, two militants of the Baloch Liberation Army (BLA) riding on a motorcycle opened fire on group of laborers working in Gwadar, Balochistan, Pakistan. The road where these labourers were working was one of a network of connecting roads that form part of the China-Pakistan Economic Corridor (CPEC) project. The gunfire resulted in the death of 10 labourers. A spokesman for the BLA claimed responsibility of attack.

June 2017 Pakistan bombings 

On 23 June 2017, a series of terrorist attacks took place in Pakistan resulting in 96 dead and over 200 wounded. They included a suicide bombing in Quetta targeting policemen, followed by two blasts at a market in Parachinar, and the targeted killing of four policemen in Karachi.

Lahore Bombings 

On 24 July 2017, a suicide bombing took place in a vegetable market in Lahore, Pakistan. 26 people were killed and 58 others were wounded as a result of the explosion. Security officials believe that the attack targeted policemen, as there were 9 killed and 6 wounded. Tehreek-i-Taliban Pakistan claimed responsibility for the attack.

August 2017 Quetta suicide bombing 

On 5 October 2017, a suicide bomber targeted the shrine of Pir Rakhel Shah situated in Fatehpur, a small town in Gandawah tehsil of Jhal Magsi District in Pakistan's southwestern Balochistan province. At least 20 people, including two policemen, were killed and more than 30 others injured in the suicide attack.

2017 Peshawar police vehicle attack 

On 24 November 2017, a suicide bomber struck the vehicle of AIG Ashraf Noor in Hayatabad, Peshawar while he was travelling to work as a result of which the vehicle caught fire killing Ashraf Noor and his guard. In the attack eight others police in the AIG's squad were injured as a result of the blast and they were taken to Hayatabad Medical Complex for treatment

2017 Peshawar Agriculture Directorate attack 

On 1 December 2017, 3–4 gunmen arrived at the hostel of Agricultural Training Institute at Agricultural University Peshawar and started firing as a result of which at least 13 people were killed and 35+ were injured. Tehreek-e-Taliban claimed responsibility for the attack.

2017 Quetta church attack 

The 2017 Quetta church attack took place on 17 December 2017 when armed militants and suicide bombers stormed the Bethel Memorial Methodist Church in the western Pakistani city of Quetta, killing nine people and injuring dozens more. The attack was perpetrated by the Islamic State, who claimed responsibility through its Amaq media outlet.

2018 Major terror attacks

2018 Peshawar suicide bombing 

On 10 July 2018, a suicide bombing occurred at the Awami National Party's workers rally in Yaka Toot area of Peshawar, Khyber Pakhtunkhwa, Pakistan. Haroon Bilour, ANP's candidate for PK-78 and prime target of the attack, was killed as a result of the bombing. The attack left 22 people dead and wounded 75 others. Tehreek-i-Taliban Pakistan claimed responsibility for the attack.

2018 Mastung and Bannu bombings 

On 13 July 2018, ahead of the Pakistan's general election, two bombings took place at election rallies in Bannu and Mastung.

In Bannu, a remotely exploded bomb planted in a motorcycle left 5 people dead and 37 others wounded in an unsuccessful attempt to assassinate former Khyber Pakhtunkhwa chief minister Akram Khan Durrani. Ittehad-ul-Mujahideen, an extremist organization, claimed responsibility for the attack.

In Mastung, a suicide bomber blew himself up during a rally for the Balochistan Awami Party's Siraj Raisani, the brother of former Balochistan chief minister Aslam Raisani. One of the deadliest terrorist attacks in Pakistani history, it killed 149 people and wounded 186 others. Siraj was taken to hospital in critical condition and died of injuries. The Islamic State of Iraq and the Levant (ISIL) claimed responsibility for the event and named the suicide bomber as Abu Bakar al-Pakistani, though authorities identified him as Hafeez Nawaz of Abbottabad.

2018 Kulachi suicide bombing 

On 22 July 2018, 3 days before general elections, a suicide bomber blew himself near the vehicle of former KPK provincial minister of Agriculture Ikramullah Khan Gandapur in Kulachi, Dera Ismail Khan District, Pakistan. The prime target of attack, Gandapur was brought to Dera Ismail Khan in critical condition where he succumbed to his wounds. Apart from Gandapur, his driver and one of his guards was also killed and three more people were injured. Tehrik-i-Taliban Pakistan (TTP) claimed responsibility for the assault describing Gandapur's killing of their colleague militants as the motive. The attack was widely condemned across Pakistan.

2018 Quetta suicide bombing 

On 25 July 2018, during polling for the 2018 Pakistani general election, a bomb blast outside a polling station in Quetta's Eastern Bypass area resulted in 31 people being killed and over 35 injured. Islamic State of Iraq and the Levant claimed responsibility for the attack, according to the group's Amaq News Agency.

2019 Major terror Attacks

January 2019 Loralai attack 

2019 Loralai attack took place on 29 January 2019 in Loralai, Pakistan. 9 people including 8 policemen and a civilian were killed while 22 others were injured when gunmen and suicide bombers attacked a Deputy Inspector General's (DIG) office. The Tehrik-i-Taliban Pakistan claimed responsibility for the attack.

February 2019 Balochistan attacks 

On 16 February 2019, armed men killed two Frontier Corps in Loralai. On 17 February 2019, two security personnel of the Frontier Corps were killed in the Gardab area of Panjgur district. The attack was carried out by the Baloch Raji Ajoi Sangar (BRAS), an alliance of three Balochi separatist organizations, the Baloch Liberation Army, Balochistan Liberation Front and Baloch Republican Guard. Some sources claimed that around nine military personnel were killed and eleven personnel were injured in the suicide attack, while others said four individuals were killed in Panjgur while other two were killed in Loralai.

2019 Hazarganji blast 

On 12 April 2019, a bomb exploded at an open market in Quetta, Pakistan. The attack reportedly left 20 dead. The bombing took place near an area where many minority Shiite Muslims live. At least nine Shiites were among the dead, one paramilitary soldier and other people were also killed in the bombing. PM Imran Khan condoled the lives lost, directed the authorities to ensure the best medical treatment for the injured and order to increase the security of Shiites and Hazara People. Lashkar-e-Jhangvi accepted the responsibility for the attack, stated "their target were Hazara people."

2019 Makran Massacre 

On 18 April 2019, gunmen shot several passengers travelling from Karachi to Gwadar. An estimated 15 to 20 armed militants stopped around five or six buses between 12:30am and 1am on a Makran Coastal Road. After the buses halted the gunmen then inspected the identity papers of the passengers and had about 16 of them disembark. At least 14 were shot dead, while two passengers managed to escape from the gunmen and travelled to the closest Balochistan Levies checkpost. They were later transported to Ormara Hospital for treatment.
Law enforcement and Levies personnel arrived at the scene shortly afterward and commenced an investigation into the attack. The victims bodies were taken from the Noor Baksh Hotel. The Baloch Raaji Aajoi Sangar (BRAS), An alliance of ethnic Baloch separatist armed groups has taken responsibility for the massacre in an email statement.
"... those who were targeted carried [identification] cards of the Pakistan Navy and Coast Guards, and they were only killed after they were identified." Raaji Aajoi Sangar, the spokesperson for the Baloch, said in the statement.

2019 Lahore bombing 

2019 Lahore bombing  was a suicide bomb attack on 8 May 2019 outside Data Darbar in Lahore, Pakistan killed at least 13 people including five policemen and injured at least 24. CCTV footage of the blast showed the bomber targeted an Elite Police mobile parked outside the shrine. Hizbul Ahrar – a splinter group of Jamaat-ul-Ahrar and Tehrik-i-Taliban Pakistan- had claimed responsibility for the attack.

2020 Major terror Attacks 

On 15 October 2020,At least 14 security personnel were killed in the first incident after a convoy of state-run Oil & Gas Development Company (OGDCL) was attacked on the coastal highway in Balochistan's Ormara, Radio Pakistan reported.

2021 Major terror Attacks

2017 timeline

February 2017 timeline 
 1 February – Three security personnel and six civilians were injured on Tuesday when a roadside blast targeted a Frontier Corps convoy in Charsadda.
 6 February – At least two policemen were injured in a militant attack at Thana Mandan police station in Bannu
 7 February – Four people including two security men were injured in an explosion on Tuesday near a Levies check post in Chaman, a border town adjacent to Afghanistan.
 10 February – Five students were injured in a roadside bomb blast in Arang area of Bajaur Agency.
 10 February – At least one child was killed and four others injured when an Improvised Explosive Device (IED) went off at Arang area.
 12 February – Samaa TV Journalist Taimoor Khan killed in an incident. Tehreek-e-Taliban Pakistan claimed the responsibility.
 12 February – Five security personnel were injured in a roadside bomb blast in Bajaur Agency's Mamond tehsil
 12 February – 3 FC Personnel killed in South Waziristan IED Explosion.
 13 February – A blast outside the provincial assembly in Lahore killed at least 14 people and injured more than 87 others.
 13 February – Two killed in Quetta IED blast.
 15 February – At least two people killed and seven others injured in a suicide blast in Peshawar's Hyatabad area.
 15 February – 5 People including 3 Levies personnel killed and Eight others were injured in a suicide attack in Mohmand Agency.
 15 February – Intelligence agency man shot dead in Nowshera firing.
 16 February – Three soldiers martyred, two injured in an IED explosion in Awaran.
 16 February – Attack on police vehicle kills Five three were also injured.

 17 February Three Frontier Corps personnel were injured after militants from Afghanistan attacked a Pakistani border check post in Khyber Agency. The ISPR reported that some militants were killed during the exchange.
 19 February A cracker blast reported in Hyderabad's Naya pul leaving 15 passerby wounded.
 20 February Five hurt in Nadra firing incident in Quetta.
 21 February Three suicide bombers targeted a sessions court in Tangi, Charsadda District, Khyber Pakhtunkhwa, killing 6 people and injuring more than 20 others.
 21 February At least two people died while another was injured in a landmine blast in Dera Bughti.
 23 February 2017 At least 45 suspects were arrested in Rawalpindi and Islamabad. Joint operations were conducted in Westridge, Dhoke Hassu and Bakery Chowk area of Cantt. The Frontier Corps (FC) and intelligence agencies foiled a major terror plot near Loralai, Balochistan. The security forces recovered 23 Improvised Explosive Devices (IEDs) during the joint targeted operation.
 26 February 2017 The apex committee of Punjab decided to expedite ongoing operation against terrorists across the province. The ISPR said that at least four terrorists were killed and more than 600 suspects detained in over 200 raids conducted by the Rangers across Punjab. The raids were conducted in various parts of Punjab, including Karor, Layyah and Rawalpindi.

March 2017 timeline 
 6 March Five soldiers of Pakistan army and 10 militants were killed in a cross border attack at three border checkpoints in Mohmand Agency.
 17 March At least three Pakistani soldiers and eight Taliban militants were killed when insurgents launched cross-border attacks on military training facilities in Khyber-Pakhtunkhwa province.

April 2017 timeline 
 14 April 4 Rangers personnel martyred and 3 were injured and Rangers kill 10 TTP militants in operation near DG khan.
 20 April Eight suspected TTP militants were killed by CTD in an intelligence based operation (IBO) in Sheikhupura.
 20 April Five terrorists were killed and 11 apprehended during search and intelligence-based operations (IBO) carried out in different parts of the country during the last 24 hours.
 25 April – 14, including six children, killed and 9, including 4 Khasadar officials, injured in a roadside blast in Kurram Agency.

June 2017 timeline 
 23 June – 14 people ─ including seven policeman ─ lost their lives, while 19 others were injured in a suicide blast that shook Shuhada Chowk in Quetta's Gulistan Road area on Friday morning.

July 2017 timeline 
 10 July – 3 people were killed and over 20 injured when a suicide bomber blew himself up at Bogra Chowk in Chaman, Baluchistan.

October 2017 timeline
 18 October - At least eight people, including seven policemen, were killed and 24 others injured in an explosion targeting a truck carrying police officials in the Sariab Mill area of Quetta.

November 2017 timeline
 9 November - A senior police officer was among three suspected militants involved in ISI Clandestine activities who died in a suicide attack on Quetta the provincial capital of Balochistan.

December 2017 timeline 
 3 December 11 BRA militants held in Balochistan raids.
 8 December Surrender of 300 militants in Quetta along with 17 commanders.

Summary of 2017 
At the end of 2017, 463 civilians, 215 soldiers and 591 terrorists were killed in 295 incidents. 906 terrorists were arrested in 179 incidents and 924 terrorists surrendered in 12 incidents

2018 timeline

January 2018 timeline 
 15 January – Security personnel were killed when their vehicle was ambushed in Balochistan.
 16 January – Gunmen killed a police constable in Quetta.
 16 January – A suicide bomber on a motorcycle in Karachi, aided by gunmen, targeted a senior officer known for leading raids on militant hideouts. The officer survived, and his guards killed two of the gunmen.
 18 January – Gunmen killed a mother and daughter working on polio vaccination in Quetta.
 30 January – A bomb explosion in the Upper Kurram Agency killed multiple members of the same family.

February 2018 timeline 
 2 February – A suicide bomber injured two guards.
 3 February – Eleven soldiers of the Pakistan Army were killed from a suicide attack near a military camp in Khyber-Pakhtunkhwa.
 5 February – Multiple casualties from a bomb that targeted a pro-government leader in Panjgur.
 5 February – Gunmen attacked two Chinese nationals in Karachi.
 5 February – Multiple casualties when a vehicle was attacked in North Waziristan.
 7 February – Multiple casualties from a remote-controlled explosion in Bajaur Agency.
 14 February – Tehrik-i-Taliban gunmen killed paramilitary soldiers in Quetta.
 16 February – A leading tribal elder and chief of a local peace committee was killed by a bomb in Bajaur Agency.
 21 February – A police checkpoint in Peshawar was attacked by people with hand grenades.
 23 February – The car of a senior government official on Peshawar's Ring Road was targeted with a bomb.
 28 February – Paramilitary soldiers were killed in a suicide bombing outside Quetta. Elsewhere in Quetta, gunmen killed two guards in a senior police officer's convoy.

March 2018 timeline 
 8 March – Two people were shot in Quetta.
 14 March – Multiple casualties in a suicide bombing at a police checkpoint outside Lahore.
 17 March – Terrorists killed polio workers and a paramilitary Frontier Corps soldier in Mohmand Agency.
 24 March – A hand grenade thrown at a spring festival in Dera Ismail Khan injured dozens of people.
 30 March – An IED killed policemen in the district police officer's convoy in Dera Ismail Khan.
 31 March – Gunfire during an operation in Balochistan resulted in the death of one soldier and one terrorist.

April 2018 timeline 
 1 April – Gunmen attacked a vehicle in Quetta, killing a member of the Shia Hazara community.
 9 April – A suicide bomber injured multiple people near a Balochistan Frontier Corps vehicle in Quetta.
 15 April – Christians were shot and killed outside a church in Quetta.
 18 April – A shopkeeper in the Shia Hazara community was shot and killed in Quetta.
 22 April – Gunmen on a motorcycle killed Shiites outside Quetta.
 24 April – Three suicide bombings killed multiple policemen in Quetta.
 26 April – Multiple people were killed by a hand grenade attack at a wedding in North Waziristan.
 28 April – Two shopkeepers in the Hazara community were shot and killed in Quetta.

May 2018 timeline 
 2 May – A roadside bomb exploded in Safi Tehsil.
 3 May – A bomb injured three security personnel in Jani Khel.
 3 May – A vehicle carrying civilian employees of an atomic agency PAEC was attacked in Attock. There were multiple casualties.
 4 May – Six labourers of Punjabi descent were shot dead in Balochistan.
 6 May – Ahsan Iqbal, Interior Minister, was shot in the shoulder while getting out of his car to attend a political meeting in Punjab province.
 11 May – A bomb targeted a police patrol at a bus stop in Bannu.
 14 May – A Shiite religious scholar was shot by Lashkar-e-Jhangvi terrorists in Khyber Pakhtunkhwa.
 27 May – Two Policemen and two militants were killed when unidentified militants opened fire on Policemen at Sarki Road in Quetta, Balochistan.

July 2018 timeline 
 13 July – 5 citizens were killed and 10 were injured after a planted bomb exploded near the car of JUI-F candidate Akram Khan Durrani in Bannu.
 24 July – At least three security personnel and a civilian were killed while 13 others sustained injuries after a military convoy on election duty came under attack in Turbat.

August 2018 timeline
 4 August – A government girls' school was torched in the Darel tehsil of the Diamer District in Gilgit-Baltistan in Pakistan. In another incident, one policeman was killed and another wounded in a gun battle in the Tangir tehsil of the same district. A militant was also killed in the incident.
 11 August – A suicide bomber of Balochistan Liberation Army targeted a bus with Chinese engineers in Dalbandin left 6 injured.
 23 August -One security personnel was killed and an additional 3 were injured in a bomb blast in North Waziristan

September 2018 timeline 

 14 September – At least three levies personnel died in a motorcycle bomb blast and another two were injured on the northern by-pass in the Pishin District of Balochistan. Hizbul Ahrar claimed responsibility.
 25 September – An IED blast in North Waziristan left a soldier dead and another injured. The Jihadi group Hizbul Ahrar claimed responsibility and claimed killing 1 and injuring 4.
 30 September – A IED went off in the Upper Dir District of the Khyber Pakhtunkhwa province of Pakistan resulting in the death of Pakistani soldier as well as the injury of another one, no group has claimed responsibility yet for this attack.

October 2018 timeline 

 2 October – Terrorists opened fire and bombed a convoy killing 3 Pakistani Security personnel and injuring 8 more at the Awaran District of Balochistan, Pakistan. No group has claimed responsibility although Terrorist groups have done similar attacks in that area in the past.
 8 October – A shooting attack left a policeman dead in Karachi,Pakistan the Hizbul-Ahrar militant group claimed responsibility and claimed injuring 3 policemen more.
 11 October – A roadside bomb targeted a vehicle belonging to the Pakistani Army in the Ladha Subdivision of South Waziristan Pakistan, resulted in the deaths of three soldiers and five wounded, the Tehrik-i-Taliban Pakistan claimed responsibility for the attack.

Summary of 2018 

At the end of 2018, 368 civilians, 163 soldiers and 166 terrorists were killed in 163 incidents. 207 terrorists were arrested in 65 incidents and 301 terrorists surrendered in 4 incidents.

2019 timeline 

 Timeline of incidents on soldiers and civilians, total result of incidents on terrorists.

January 2019 timeline 

 1 January – Four Frontier Corp were killed in Loralai, Balochistan. 
 4 January – One terrorist was killed in KPK.
 5 January - 6 civilians were injured in bomb blast in Peshawar.
 6 January - 10 people were injured in blast in Balochistan.
 6 January - 2 soldiers were killed in Balochistan.
 16 January - 4 terrorists were killed in KPK.
 23 January - One person was killed in suicide blast.
 29 January - 2019 Loralai attack
 Total of 16 terrorists were arrested and 15 were killed.

February 2019 timeline 

 6 February - 28 Missing people made to their homes.
 12 February - One cop was killed in Sindh.
 12 February - Four cops were killed in KPK.
 13 February - One civilian was killed in KPK.
 13 February - 3 Civilians were killed.
 15 February - 2 civilians were killed in karachi.
 16 February - 2 Soldiers were killed in Balochistan.
 17 February - 4 soldiers were killed in Balochistan
 19 February - 2 soldiers were injured in blast in Balochistan.
 24 February - 1 civilian was killed in blast in Balochistan.
 Total of 224 terrorists were arrested and 3 were killed.

March 2019 timeline 

 3 March - One cop was killed in Sindh.
 4 March - 5 civilians were injured in blast in Balochistan.
 7 March - 44 terrorists surrendered in Balochistan.
 8 March - 4 soldiers were killed in Balochistan. 
 14 March - One person was killed in KPK.
 14 March - 2 civilians were killed in Balochistan.
 17 March - 5 Civilians were killed in Balochistan.
 18 March - 3 people were injured in blast in KPK.
 21 March - 6 soldiers were killed in Balochistan.
 24 March - 2 civilians were injured in KPK.
 24 March - 3 civilians were killed in Balochistan.
 29 March - One person was killed in KPK.
 Total of 168 terrorists were arrested, 4 were killed and 44 surrendered.

April 2019 timeline 

 4 April - 50 terrorists surrendered in Balochistan.
 8 April - 28,000 personals belonging to both Levies and Khasadar forces merged into Police forces
 9 April - One civilian was killed in KPK.
 9 April – Three terrorists were arrested in Punjab.
 9 April - One big terrorist was arrested in Peshwar, KPK.
 12 April - 2019 Quetta attack: 22 people and one suicide bomber were killed in Hazarganji, Quetta.
 12 April - two civilians were killed Chaman.
 14 April - 7 suspects arrested in case of plotting a bomb on railway track, which was defused, in thatta, Sindh.
 14 April - One civilian was killed, accused arrested in Peshawar Khyber.
 14 April - One child was killed by picking up grenade in thinking of toy in Karak District, Khyber.
 14 April - 17 terrorists arrested in search operation in different parts of Karachi, Sindh.
 16 April - 11 including one policeman arrested for facilitating the terrorists in different parts of Karachi.
 16 April - 5 terrorists and one policeman were killed in an operation in Peshawar, KPK.
 18 April - 2019 Makran Massacre: 14 people including two soldiers were killed on Makran Coastal Highway.
 19 April - Sindh rangers arrested 16 suspected terrorists in Karachi.
 19 April - The Counter Terrorism Department (CTD) arrested two terrorists in KPK.
 24 April - A Special Police force officer escorting polio team shot dead KPK.
 25 April - A female polio worker shot dead in Balochistan.
 26 April - Rangers arrested four terrorists in Bahawalpur.
 27 April - Three soldiers were killed and two injured in a blast in KPK.
 29 April - Two soldiers killed and one injured in separate attacks in KPK.

May 2019 timeline 

 1 May - One journalist was killed in KPK.
 1 May - One Jundallah terrorist was arrested in Karachi.
 1 May - Three soldiers were killed and seven other injured in separate attacks on Pak-Afghan Border.
 2 May - Police arrested two terrorists in KPK.
 4 May - A polio worker was shot dead in KPK.
 5 May - One police officer was killed in Faisalabad. 
 6 May - One soldier was killed and three other injured in an attack on Pak-Afghan Border.
 8 May - One terrorist was arrested in Peshawar.
 8 May - Three people were killed in a blast in KPK.
 8 May – 2019 Lahore bombing: 13 people including 8 police officers were killed in a blast in Lahore.
 9 May - Five people including three soldiers were killed in Balochistan.
 9 May - Five suspects were arrested in Lahore.
 9 May - Two terrorists were killed in KPK.
 11 May - Five people including one soldier and three terrorists were killed in Gwadar clash in Balochistan.
 13 May - Four policemen were killed in Balochistan. 
 15 May - Three labourers were killed in an attack in Balochistan. 
 16 May - Nine terrorists were killed in Balochistan.
 17 May - One terrorist was killed in Sindh.
 17 May - Three terrorists were killed in Balochistan.
 19 May - One terrorist was arrested in Karachi.
 19 May - One terrorist was killed in KPK.
 20 May - One terrorist was arrested in Lahore.
 20 May - Two terrorists were arrested in Karachi.
 23 May - Two terrorists were killed in KPK.
 23 May - Two terrorists sentenced two death in case of killing Lawyer in 2011.
 24 May - Four worshipers were killed and 28 wounded in bomb blast in Mosque in Quetta.
 24 May - One worshiper was killed in Karachi.

June 2019 timeline

July 2019 timeline

August 2019 timeline

September 2019 timeline

October 2019 timeline

November 2019 timeline

December 2019 timeline 

On 29 December 2019, Qari Saifullah Mehsud was shot dead by two unknown gunmen in Khost Province of Afghanistan. According to the locals, the two gunmen had been "guests" at the TTP commander's home for several days before they killed him and fled. Qari Saifullah Mehsud was a key Tehrik-i-Taliban Pakistan (TTP) commander and was among the terrorists most wanted to Pakistan for his involvement in several terror attacks in the country. He was notorious for preparing suicide jackets and suicide bombers for terrorist acts and was also the mastermind behind 2015 Karachi bus shooting. According to the Analysts, the killing of Mehsud is a big hit for the TTP as he was trying to unite all the split militant groups. His death was also confirmed by TTP. Mehsud was also previously arrested by U.S. forces in Afghanistan in 2016 but was later released after spending 14 weeks in jail in Afghanistan. Mehsud funeral ceremony and burial took place in Gurbaz district of Khost Province.

2020 timeline

January 2020 timeline
On 30 January, two senior members of TTP were shot dead by unknown gunmen in Kabul, Afghanistan. The deceased were identified to be Sheikh Khalid Haqqani and Qari Saif Younis and their bodies were found in the vicinity of Intercontinental Hotel in Kabul. Sheikh Khalid Haqqani held key position in the TTP leadership council, and formerly served as the group's deputy leader. He was accused of being involved in several high-profile attacks on Pakistani politicians and an attack on school in Peshawar in 2014. Qari Saif Younis was a military commander in TTP and directed suicide operations. According to one militant source, the men were planning to hold a secret "meeting" in Kabul, on the direct orders of the group's leadership, apparently travelling from the eastern Afghan province of Paktika. The militants did not reveal who they were planning on meeting. Both the TTP members were killed on 30 January, however, their death was confirmed on 7 February by the TTP leadership. The TTP leadership had initially ordered the news to be kept "secret", partly as they were rattled by the assassinations, and partly to avoid awkward questions about why the men were in the city.

The statement from TTP said that the two men were killed in clashes with the United States troops. However, the sources within the group also acknowledged that it was also possible that gunmen or militants linked to Pakistani intelligence services were responsible for the assassination. The bodies of the men killed in Kabul were handed over to the group, and a large funeral was held for them on Monday in their stronghold in eastern Kunar province.

February 2020 timeline
 17 February  - February 2020 Quetta bombing

March 2020 timeline

April 2020 timeline

May 2020 timeline

June 2020 timeline
 29 June 29 - Pakistan Stock Exchange attack

July 2020 timeline
 29 July  - A soldier was killed in a terrorist attack at Bajaur security post.

August 2020 timeline
 5 August – At least 39 people were injured in an RGD-1 grenade attack on a Jamaat-i-Islami rally in the Gulshan-e-Iqbal neighborhood of Karachi. The Sindhudesh Revolutionary Army claimed responsibility for the attack.
 10 August – A bomb killed at least 5 people and several others were injured in Chaman, Balochistan.

September 2020 timeline

October 2019 timeline
On 15 October 2020,At least 14 security personnel were killed in the first incident after a convoy of state-run Oil & Gas Development Company (OGDCL) was attacked on the coastal highway in Balochistan's Ormara, Radio Pakistan reported.

  16 October -
 An attack kills least 7 soldiers and 7 security guards in Balochistan.
 A bomb kills at least 6 members of the Army in North Waziristan.
 21 October - At least 5 people were killed and 27 others were injured in an explosion at an apartment building in Karachi.
 27 October - 2020 Peshawar school bombing - Eight students were killed in a bombing at a school in Peshawar, Khyber Pakhtunkhwa.

November 2020 timeline

December 2020 timeline

2021 timeline

January 2021 timeline
3 January - Machh attack

February 2021 timeline
 22 February - Ippi shooting

March 2021 timeline
 24 March - 2021 Chaman bombings

April 2021 timeline
 21 April - Quetta Serena Hotel bombing

May 2021 timeline
 21 May - 2021 Chaman bombings
 31 May - May 2021 Balochistan attacks

June 2021 timeline
 23 June - 2021 Lahore bombing

July 2021 timeline
14 July- a Bus carrying Chinese workers in the Dasu area of Upper Kohistan District fell into a ravine after an explosion, killing 13 people, including nine Chinese residents and 4 Pakistanis, and injured 28 others.

August 2021 timeline
 9 August - August 2021 Quetta bombing
 14 August - Karachi grenade attack
 20 August - Gwadar suicide attack
 26 August - August 2021 Balochistan attacks

September 2021 timeline
 5 September  - 2021 Quetta suicide attack
 11 September - Two soldiers of Frontier Corps South were killed and another was injured when armed men attacked their convoy in the Buleda area of Kech district.
 15 September  - Seven soldiers of the Pakistan Army were  killed during an intelligence-based operation in the Asman Manza area of South Waziristan.
 24 September  - Two security personnel were killed and five others injured in an attack in Awaran district.
 25 September  - Four security personnel were killed and two others injured in a bomb attack on a vehicle of the Frontier Corps in the Khosat area of Harnai district.

2022 timeline

January 2022 timeline 
20 January - 2022 Lahore bombing
25 January - 2022 Kech District attack

February 2022 timeline 
 2 February - 2022 Panjgur and Naushki raids

March 2022 timeline 
 2 March - 2022 Quetta bombing
 3 March - 2022 Sibi suicide bombing
 4 March - 2022 Peshawar mosque attack
 15 March - 2022 Sibi IED explosion

April 2022 timeline 
 26 April - 2022 University of Karachi bombing

May 2022 timeline 
 12 May - 2022 Karachi Saddar bombing
 15 May - Miranshah gunfiring 2022
 16 May - 2022 Karachi Bolton Market bombing

September 2022 timeline 
 13 September - 2022 Swat blast

November 2022 timeline 
 16 November - 2022 Lakki Marwat attack
 30 November - 2022 Quetta suicide attack

December 2022 timeline 
 14 December - December 2022 Miranshah suicide bombing
 18 December - 2022 Bannu CTD centre attack
 23 December - 2022 Islamabad suicide attack
 25 December - Five Pakistan Army personnel were killed in a improvised explosive device (IED) blast during a clearance operation in Kahan, Balochistan.

2023 timeline

January 2023 timeline 
3 January–
Two intelligence officers, including the director of the provincial counterterrorism department, are shot dead outside a restaurant in Khanewal, Punjab, Pakistan, by suspected Pakistani Taliban gunmen.
 The government orders the closure of all shopping malls and retail markets by 8:30 p.m. (PKT) daily as part of an energy conservation plan to offset increasing energy prices.
13 January –2022 Sarband police station attack

References

Military operations of the insurgency in Khyber Pakhtunkhwa
2017 in Pakistan
Conflicts in 2017